The Larcomar is a shopping center in the Miraflores district of Lima, Peru owned by Chilean company Parque Arauco S.A. It was opened on 27 November 1998. It is frequently visited by international tourists, as well as by locals from Miraflores and other parts of Lima. It is located on Avenida Jose Larco, and it is along the cliff next to the ocean (mar means 'sea' in Spanish) thus the name Larcomar. The Larcomar has indoor and outdoor areas, includes a cinema, bowling lanes, a food court, museum, tourist shops, Tony Roma's, T.G.I. Friday's, and Chili's restaurants, book stores, clothing stores, and electronics stores. It is directly across the street from the Marriott hotel.

2016 Larcomar fire disaster

On Wednesday, 16 November 2016, a major fire broke out in Larcomar. The fire started in the UVK cinema, and quickly spread into most of the mall. Although the cause of the fire was initially unknown to local authorities, the Peruvian National Police (Policía Nacional de Perú) eventually concluded that the origin of the fire was from an external element. This was concluded when a video tape (recorded by a security camera) showed a man (Luis Raúl Salazar) walking out of the movie theatre in a suspicious way. Although he initially surrendered to the police, he later denied his involvement in the fire. Later on, however, the DIESE (División de Investigaciones Especiales de Seguridad del Estado), a government agency put in place to investigate major incidents and safety risks to citizens, concluded that the fire was actually started when a short circuit blew out in one of the movie theatre rooms, therefore clearing any charges the prosecution had named. In total, more than 200 people were evacuated from the mall, and 12 different fire fighting units arrived at Larcomar during the fire. There were a total of 4 deaths caused by the fire: Joel Mario Condori Rejas, Zoledad Moreima Oliveros Trujillo, Sonia Garciela Repetto Chamchumbi, and Ana Betsabé Torres Cochachiín.

References

External links
Official Website

Buildings and structures in Lima
Shopping malls in Peru
Tourist attractions in Lima
Economy of Lima